Mount Fable is located in the Fairholme Range of Alberta. It was first ascended in 1947 by L. Parker, R.C. Hind and J.F. Tarrant. It was named Fable by the first ascent party in reference to a story about heavy bush causing a prior attempt to fail, which they considered a fable.

See also 
Mountains of Alberta

References 

Fable
Alberta's Rockies